George Dewey Downing (May 30, 1897 – May 9, 1973) was an American football, basketball and baseball coach. He served as the head football coach at Tusculum College—now known as Tusculum University—Tusculum, Tennessee and Morehead State University in Morehead, Kentucky from 1927 to 1935, compiling a career college football coaching record of 29–37–3. Downing was the head basketball coach as Tusculum in 1923–24 and at Morehead State from 1929 to 1936. He was also the head baseball coach at Morehead State from 1927 to 1936, tallying a mark of 38–20.

References

External links
 

1897 births
1973 deaths
Basketball coaches from Kentucky
Kentucky Wildcats football players
Morehead State Eagles athletic directors
Morehead State Eagles baseball coaches
Morehead State Eagles football coaches
Morehead State Eagles men's basketball coaches
Tusculum Pioneers football coaches
Tusculum Pioneers men's basketball coaches
People from Fayette County, Kentucky
Players of American football from Kentucky